Grigori Fursin is a British computer scientist, vice president of MLOps at OctoML and the president of the non-profit CTuning foundation. His research group created open-source machine learning based self-optimizing compiler, MILEPOST GCC, considered to be the first in the world. At the end of the MILEPOST project he established cTuning foundation to crowdsource program optimisation and machine learning across diverse devices provided by volunteers. His foundation also developed Collective Knowledge Framework to support open research. Since 2015 Fursin leads Artifact Evaluation at several ACM and IEEE computer systems conferences. He is also a founding member of the ACM taskforce on Data, Software, and Reproducibility in Publication.

Education 
Fursin received a Master of Science degree in physics and mathematics from the Moscow Institute of Physics and Technology in 1999. 
He completed his PhD in computer science at the University of Edinburgh in 2005. 
While in Edinburgh, he worked on foundations of practical program autotuning and performance prediction.

Notable projects 

 Collective Knowledge – open-source framework to help researchers and practitioners organize their software projects as a database of reusable components and portable workflows with common APIs based on FAIR principles, and quickly prototype, crowdsource and reproduce research experiments.
 MILEPOST GCC – open-source technology to build machine learning based compilers.
 Interactive Compilation Interface – plugin framework to expose internal features and optimisation decisions of compilers for external auto tuning and learning.
 cTuning foundation – non-profit research organisation developing open-source tools and common methodology for collaborative and reproducible experimentation.

References

British computer scientists
Living people
Alumni of the University of Edinburgh
Year of birth missing (living people)
Moscow Institute of Physics and Technology alumni